Lucas Eriksson (born 10 April 1996) is a Swedish cyclist, who currently rides for UCI ProTeam . His brother Jacob is also a professional cyclist on the same team.

Major results

2013
 1st Mountains classification, Trofeo Karlsberg
 6th Road race, UCI Junior Road World Championships
2014
 1st Stage 3 Peace Race Juniors
 2nd Time trial, National Junior Road Championships
 7th Road race, UCI Junior Road World Championships
 8th Paris–Roubaix Juniors
2015
 6th Skive–Løbet
2016
 1st  Road race, National Under-23 Road Championships
 9th Overall Tour de Bretagne
2018
 1st  Road race, National Road Championships
 4th Scandinavian Race Uppsala
 5th Road race, UEC European Under-23 Road Championships
 6th Overall Tour of Estonia
 7th Ringerike GP
 9th GP Horsens
 10th Himmerland Rundt
2019
 1st  Road race, National Road Championships
 10th GP Industria & Artigianato di Larciano
2020
 3rd Road race, National Road Championships
2021
 1st  Overall Circuit des Ardennes
1st Stage 1
 3rd Road race, National Road Championships
 3rd Lillehammer GP
 8th Overall Tour of Norway
 10th Overall Danmark Rundt
2022
 1st  Road race, National Road Championships
 1st  Overall Circuit des Ardennes
 1st  Overall Kreiz Breizh Elites
 9th Lillehammer GP

References

External links

Swedish male cyclists
1996 births
Living people
People from Borås Municipality
Sportspeople from Västra Götaland County